Vince House (July 21, 1929 – July 18, 2002) was an American film and television actor. He appeared in over 100 films and television programs, and was perhaps best known for playing the co-starring role of "Motorcycle Officer Vince" in NBC's Emergency! and as "Mr. Peter Butler" in Mr. Novak.

Early life 
Howard was born in St. Louis, Missouri. Howard attended and graduated at Vashon High School. After attending and graduating from Vashon High School, he served in the army, as a truck driver in Germany. He was also part of the singing group, The Rhythm Aces, with Willie Davis, Billy Steward, Lloyd McGraw and Chuck Rowan, where he also changed his surname to "Howard".

Howard left the Rhythm Aces, where he later joined the rock 'n roll group, Billy Ward and his Dominoes. He left the group, where he settled to move to Los Angeles, California, where he was hired to work as a technician for the Radio Corporation of America, in 1958. Howard later performed in the nightclub The Horn at Santa Monica, California, where he was later hired for the role of the history teacher "Mr. Peter Butler", where producer, E. Jack Neuman, saw his performance on stage.

Career 
Howard began his career in 1963, where he co-starred in the new NBC dramatic television series, Mr. Novak. After the series ended in 1965, he began appearing in numerous television programs, such as, The Fugitive, Kolchak: The Night Stalker, Hawaii Five-O, Cannon, The Time Tunnel, Get Smart, Bewitched, Gidget, The Monkees, Star Trek: The Original Series and I Dream of Jeannie. Howard has also appeared in starred, co-starred and appeared in films such as Where It's At, Lethal Weapon 3, I Love You, Alice B. Toklas, Fuzz, The Barefoot Executive, The Man and Suppose They Gave a War and Nobody Came.

In 1970s-1994, Howard played recurring roles in television programs including The Smith Family, Barnaby Jones, The Streets of San Francisco. He also co-starred in Emergency!, playing the role of "Motorcycle Officer Vince", in which he mostly appeared in scenes where the Los Angeles County Fire Department squad arrives, later being an extra help to them. While Howard was appearing in numerous television programs and films, he retired his career, last appearing in the crime drama television series Murder, She Wrote, in 1994.

Death 
Howard died of leukemia on July 18, 2002, three days before his 73rd birthday.

Filmography

Film

Television

References

External links 

Rotten Tomatoes profile

1929 births
2002 deaths
Deaths from leukemia
People from St. Louis County, Missouri
Male actors from Missouri
American male film actors
American male television actors
20th-century American male actors
20th-century African-American people
21st-century African-American people
American truck drivers
Technicians